Johannes Nolten (5 November 1908 – 7 February 1974) was a Dutch wrestler. He competed in the men's Greco-Roman featherweight at the 1928 Summer Olympics.

References

External links
 

1908 births
1974 deaths
Dutch male sport wrestlers
Olympic wrestlers of the Netherlands
Wrestlers at the 1928 Summer Olympics
Sportspeople from Amsterdam